Federal Protective Service may refer to:

Federal Protective Service (United States), a U.S. security police force responsible for the security of buildings owned by the U.S. federal government
Federal Protective Service (Russia),  the successor of the KGB Ninth Chief Directorate, now an independent organization